Alfons Deloor (his name is also given as "De Loor") (3 June 1910 - 23 March 1995) was a Belgian racing cyclist. He reached second place at the 1936 Vuelta a España behind his brother Gustaaf, and won the 1938 Liège–Bastogne–Liège.

Biography
Alfons Deloor was the fourth of five sons. Their father worked as a farmhand during the season, and in the coal mines of Hainaut otherwise. The family lived in De Klinge, a small Flemish town near the border with the Netherlands. Alfons and  his younger brother Gustaaf were taught to ride a bike by their elder brother Edward.

His first cycling success came in 1931, finishing ninth in Liège–Bastogne–Liège. He went on to finish second in the 1932 Tour of Flanders. The same year, he was tenth in Paris–Roubaix, which he improved upon in the 1933 edition by finishing sixth. In the 1933 Tour de France, he finished 27th, and he was fourth in the 1933 Tour of Flanders and second in the Tour of Belgium. 

In 1934, he ended in second place in the Volta a Catalunya, where he won the second stage, and third in the Tour of Belgium. He finished 6th in the 1935 Vuelta a España, which was won by his brother Gustaaf. That same year he finished 7th in Liège–Bastogne–Liège and tenth in Paris–Nice. The next year, he finished second behind his brother, and won the 14th stage. It is the only time that two brothers ended first and second in any of the three Grand Tours. That same year he ended sixth in the Tour de Suisse and third in Paris–Nice. 

His most major win came in 1938, bringing home Liège–Bastogne–Liège. His career was brutally ended by the Second World War, and afterwards he became a crane driver, mainly working on building and maintaining dykes.

Notes

External links

1910 births
1995 deaths
Belgian male cyclists
Cyclists from Hainaut (province)
People from Manage, Belgium